Donald Aldridge may refer to:

 Donald O. Aldridge (born 1932), United States Air Force general
 Donald R. Aldridge (born 1937), member of the Arizona House of Representatives